Mohammad Najeeb Qasmi Sambhali is an Indian Sunni Islamic scholar who established Al-Noor Public School, Sambhal. He is an alumnus of Darul Uloom Deoband, Delhi University and the Jamia Millia Islamia. He has authored Dars-e-Hadith, Dars-e-Quran, Islahi Mazameen, Journey to Madina, Qur'an and Hadith - Main Sources of Islamic Ideology and Umrah Ka Tariqah

Biography
Mohammad Najeeb Qasmi is a grandson of Ismail Sambhali who was a hadith scholar and an activist of the Indian Independence movement. Ismail Sambhali was professor of hadith at the Madrasa Shahi in Moradabad and his students include Athar Mubarakpuri and Nizamuddin Asir Adrawi. Najeeb Qasmi studied traditional dars-e-nizami at the Darul Uloom Deoband and graduated from there in 1994. He received a B.A. from Jamia Millia Islamia and an M.A in Arabic from the Delhi University. He completed his doctoral studies at the Jamia Millia Islamia.

Qasmi established Al-Noor Public School in Sambhal, Uttar Pradesh on 21 December 2018. The foundation stone was laid down by teachers of the Darul Uloom Deoband and Jamia Millia Islamia. His articles have appeared in Monthly al-Bayyinat of Jamia Binoria and in Jahan-e-Urdu. His articles regularly appear in The Inquilab, The Munsif Daily, The Siasat Daily, Urdu Times, Avadhnama and other Indian and Pakistani newspapers like Daily Jang and Daily Express. He also writes on his website, which was released in a function held in Riyadh on 4 January 2013 by a number of Indian scholars. Saudi Gazette in its report called the website a brain child of Qasmi. At the launch program, Qasmi said, "Given the popularity of the Internet, many new websites with Islamic names are launched regularly, misinterpreting Islamic teachings. This website provides reliable Islamic content for users". He launched Hajj-e-Mabroor application to help provide accurate information about Hajj and Umrah. It was released in 2015 in by Muhammad Mustafa Azmi. The application has articles, books and videos of Qasmi in English, Hindi and Urdu covering various aspects of Hajj and Umrah. In 2019, Qasmi was conferred with the Watan Ke Ratna Award.

Literary works
Qasmi's set of 38 books was released by Muhammad Mustafa Azmi whilst his six books were released in Ansari auditorium of Jamia Millia Islamia (JMI) by the former VC of JMI, Talat Ahmad, Akhtarul Wasey and Abul Qasim Nomani. His books include:
Dars-e-Hadith
 Dars-e-Quran
 Islahi Mazameen (released by Akhtarul Wasey)
 Journey to Madina
 Qur'an and Hadith - Main Sources of Islamic Ideology
 Umrah Ka Tariqah

References

External links 
Mohammad Najeeb Qasmi Sambhali - Official Website
Dr. Mohammad Najeeb Qasmi's posts - The Clear Evidence

Year of birth missing (living people)
Living people
People from Sambhal district
Indian male writers
Scholars from Uttar Pradesh
Indian Sunni Muslim scholars of Islam
Deobandis
Darul Uloom Deoband alumni
Delhi University alumni
Jamia Millia Islamia alumni